Tredegar Town Football Club are a football club based in Tredegar, in Wales. The club plays in the Ardal Leagues South East, tier 3 of the Welsh football pyramid.

History
Tredegar Town AFC was formed over 40 years ago in 1968 by its present life president Cliff Bethel to provide a recreation for those young men who preferred playing association football to Rugby Union, the team was originally known as the Rhyd Boys Club and was known throughout Wales for sending players to represent Wales at school boy and Boys Club of Wales level.

In 1983 the team changed to Tredegar Town AFC and moved on to senior level football initially plying their trade in the North Gwent Division One League rising to a Premier Division place in the 1980s.

With the introduction of the Welsh League Pyramid of non-league clubs Tredegar gained a place in the Gwent County FA League and played their games at the Recreation Ground. The team rose from Division 3 to Division 2 then to the top division, then in season 1997–98 they won the Gwent County League and applied to the Welsh League for membership and joined the Welsh Football League in season 1998–99.

After one season they finished runners up in the league and gained promotion to Welsh Football League Division Two in 2000–01 and remained in this division until they were relegated at the end of the 2009–10 season.

Stadium 

In August 2004 Tredegar moved from the Recreation Ground to a purpose built ground at Tredegar Leisure Centre. Lights were added with the help of funding from the Welsh League and the local council.

Honours

Gwent County League Division 1 Champions – 1997–98
Gwent County League Division 2 Champions – 1992–93, 1994–95

References

External links
 Football Association of Wales page

Football clubs in Wales
Association football clubs established in 1968
Gwent County League clubs
Welsh Football League clubs
Ardal Leagues clubs